Beaconsfield is the name of a suburb of Kimberley, South Africa, formerly known as Du Toit's Pan. Beaconsfield was a separate borough from Kimberley itself until its amalgamation with the latter as the City of Kimberley in 1912.

References

Populated places in the Sol Plaatje Local Municipality